Trautmannsdorf in Oststeiermark is a former municipality with 859 inhabitants (1 January 2016) in the district of Südoststeiermark in the Austrian state of Styria. Since 1 January 2015 Trautmannsdorf is part of a new municipality with Bad Gleichenberg, Bairisch Kölldorf and Merkendorf. The new municipality is called Bad Gleichenberg.

Population

References

Cities and towns in Südoststeiermark District